Sheet Music Plus, also known as SheetMusicPlus.com, is an American online retailer of sheet music, located in Berkeley, California, United States. It was founded in 1995 by Nicholas Babchuk. From 2008 to May 2010, the CEO was Keith Cerny. From May 2010 to June 2018, the CEO was Jenny Silva.  Silva was succeeded by former vice president of product and engineering, Amy Hopson.

Description
Sheet Music Plus offers a large selection of sheet music, with more than 1 million titles across multiple genres, including classical, jazz, blues, rock, opera, bluegrass, pop, country, choral, concert band, Latin music and R&B. They work with over 1,000 publishers, including all major European publishers. Sheet Music Plus is active in the music community and hires musicians when possible.

Digital Print Sheet Music 
Sheet Music Plus specialises in both printed and digital sheet music. Their Digital Print service offers sheet music titles that are available to print instantly. They currently offer over 450,000 digital print titles from a variety of publishers, including Hal Leonard and Alfred Music.

Digital Print Publishing
In 2013, the company introduced a new service, Digital Print Publishing, which offers independent composers and arrangers the ability to publish and sell their music digitally in the online catalog. Composers earn 45% commission for their titles and gain worldwide exposure. Sheet Music Plus has published over 25,000 titles digitally from independent publishers.

History
In 1995, Nick Babchuk founded MusicianStore.com, a self-run pilot website, on the 1300 block of Pacific Ave. in San Francisco. At this time they sold guitar strings, drum heads and musician's accessories in addition to sheet music. According to former CEO Keith Cerny, the company was "profitable from almost the very beginning". As demand for sheet music became apparent along with advantages of shipping printed material the name was changed to Sheet Music Plus. In 2005 the warehouse was moved from San Francisco to its present location in Emeryville, CA. The new 25,000 sq. ft. warehouse allowed for more space as well as better access to shipping routes. Sheet Music Plus currently offers over 30,000 in-stock titles, ready to ship within 24 hours.

In 2007, the company reached 550,000 titles in the catalog. In 2008, Keith Cerny assumed the role of CEO when founder Nick Babchuk became Chairman of the company. Mr. Cerny oversaw the creation of an advanced company data center in San Francisco, which set the foundation for the company's technological future. In 2010, Cerny resigned to become General Director of the Dallas Opera. He was succeeded by current CEO and long-time Sheet Music Plus employee Jenny Silva.

Under Silva's tenure the company expanded the catalog to over one million titles. She has also overseen the creation and development of the popular Digital Print Publishing program for composers, arrangers and songwriters. Mrs. Silva was also instrumental in the partnership with the Canadian Choral Center in 2012.

Emeryville, California – February 27, 2017 – Sverica Capital Management LLC (“Sverica”) announced today the sale of Sheet Music Plus LLC (“Sheet Music Plus” or “SMP”) to Hal Leonard LLC.  Founded in 1997, Sheet Music Plus is a leading online retailer of sheet music with a library of over 1 million titles.

Silva resigned from her role as CEO on May 31, 2018.  Amy Hopson, a long time Sheet Music Plus employee and former vice president of product and engineering, replaced Mrs. Silva as general manager.

The current leadership team of Sheet Music Plus is:

Amy Hopson- General Manager

Ben Speelman- Vice President of Marketing and Merchandising

Sean P Doherty- Operations Manager

Canadian Choral Center
In 2012 Sheet Music Plus partnered with the Canadian Choral Center in Winnipeg, Manitoba in Canada. The founder, Judy Pringle, is a choral music specialist and ran the company herself for many years. The Canadian Choral Center ships to over 10,000 customers across Canada with their exclusive customs-free shipping to Canada. Judy publishes a regular choral newsletter and is a prominent figure in the Canadian choral music scene.

Awards and honors
 Top 500 Internet Retailer 2007 - 2014 
 Stevie Award Finalist 2005-2007

References

Online retailers of the United States